The 2019 European Parliament election for the election of the delegation from the Netherlands was held on May 23, 2019.
This was the 9th time the elections have been held for the European elections in the Netherlands.

About the candidate lists

Participation of political groups

Numbering of the candidates list 

The official order and names of candidate lists:

| colspan="6" | 
|-
! style="background-color:#E9E9E9;text-align:center;vertical-align:top;" colspan=5 | Lists
|-
!style="background-color:#E9E9E9;text-align:center;" colspan="3"|List
!style="background-color:#E9E9E9;| English translation
!style="background-color:#E9E9E9;| List name (Dutch)

|-
| 1
| 
| style="text-align:left;" | list
| style="text-align:left;" | Democrats 66 (D66)
| style="text-align:left;" | Democraten 66 (D66)

|-
| 2
| 
| style="text-align:left;" | list
| style="text-align:left;" | CDA - European People's Party
| style="text-align:left;" | CDA - Europese Volkspartij

|-
| 3
| 
| style="text-align:left;" | list
| style="text-align:left;" |  PVV (Party for Freedom)
| style="text-align:left;" | PVV (Partij voor de Vrijheid)

|-
| 4
| 
| style="text-align:left;" | list
| style="text-align:left;" | VVD
| style="text-align:left;" | VVD

|-
| 5
| 
| style="text-align:left;" | list
| style="text-align:left;" | SP (Socialist Party)
| style="text-align:left;" | SP (Socialistische Partij)

|-
| 6
| 
| style="text-align:left;" | list
| style="text-align:left;" | P.v.d.A./European Social Democrats
| style="text-align:left;" | P.v.d.A./Europese Sociaaldemocraten

|-
| 7	
| 
| style="text-align:left;" | list
| style="text-align:left;" | Christian Union-SGP
| style="text-align:left;" | ChristenUnie–SGP

|-
| 8
| 
| style="text-align:left;" | list
| style="text-align:left;" | GreenLeft
| style="text-align:left;" | GROENLINKS

|-
| 9
| 
| style="text-align:left;" | list
| style="text-align:left;" | Party for the Animals
| style="text-align:left;" | Partij voor de Dieren

|-
| 10
| 
| style="text-align:left;" | list
| style="text-align:left;" | 50PLUS
| style="text-align:left;" | 50PLUS

|-
| 11
| 
| style="text-align:left;" | list
| style="text-align:left;" | Jesus Lives
| style="text-align:left;" | JEZUS LEEFT

|-
| 12
| 
| style="text-align:left;" | list
| style="text-align:left;" | DENK
| style="text-align:left;" | DENK

|-
| 13
| 
| style="text-align:left;" | list
| style="text-align:left;" | The Greens
| style="text-align:left;" | De Groenen

|-
| 14
| 
| style="text-align:left;" | list
| style="text-align:left;" | Forum for Democracy
| style="text-align:left;" | Forum voor Democratie

|-
| 15
| 
| style="text-align:left;" | list
| style="text-align:left;" | Of the Region & Pirate Party
| style="text-align:left;" | vandeRegio & Piratenpartij

|-
| 16
| 
| style="text-align:left;" | list
| style="text-align:left;" | Volt Netherlands
| style="text-align:left;" | Volt Nederland

|-
|-
| style="text-align:left;" colspan="11"|Source:
|}

Candidate lists

Democrats 66 (D66) - ALDE 

Below is the candidate list for the Democrats 66 for the 2019 European Parliament election

CDA - European People's Party 

Below is the candidate list for the Christian Democratic Appeal for the 2019 European Parliament election

PVV (Party for Freedom) 

Below is the candidate list for the Party for Freedom for the 2019 European Parliament election

VVD 

Below is the candidate list for the People's Party for Freedom and Democracy for the 2019 European Parliament election

SP (Socialist Party) 

Below is the candidate list for the Socialist Party for the 2019 European Parliament election

P.v.d.A./European Social Democrats 

Below is the candidate list for the Labour Party for the 2019 European Parliament election

Christian Union-SGP 
Below is the candidate list for the Christian Union-SGP for the 2019 European Parliament election

GreenLeft 

Below is the candidate list for the GreenLeft for the 2019 European Parliament election

Party for the Animals 

Below is the candidate list for the Party for the Animals for the 2019 European Parliament election

50PLUS 

Below is the candidate list for the 50PLUS for the 2019 European Parliament election

Jesus Lives 

Below is the candidate list for Jesus Lives for the 2019 European Parliament election

Denk 
Below is the candidate list for the Denk for the 2019 European Parliament election

The Greens 

Below is the candidate list for The Greens for the 2019 European Parliament election

Forum for Democracy 
Below is the candidate list for the Forum for Democracy for the 2019 European Parliament election

From the Region & Pirate Party 

Below is the candidate list for the From the Region & Pirate Party for the 2019 European Parliament election

Volt Netherlands 
Below is the candidate list for Volt Netherlands for the 2019 European Parliament election

References

2019
Netherlands